Docang is a traditional food from Cirebon, a port town in West Java, Indonesia. It is made of sliced of rice cake, cassava leaves, sprouts, and krupuk, served in thick vegetable sauce called dage, which is made of mashed tempeh mixed with grated coconut. This food has a distinctive savoury flavor and usually served warm for breakfast and it is sold in relatively affordable price. Today, authentic docang is rarely found even in Cirebon.

See also

 Sega Jamblang
 Empal gentong

Cirebonese cuisine
Vegetarian dishes of Indonesia